Euptelea is a genus of two species of flowering plants in the monogeneric family Eupteleaceae.  The genus is found from Assam east through China to Japan, and consists of shrubs or small trees:
Euptelea pleiosperma
Euptelea polyandra

The genus was previously placed in the family Trochodendraceae, but the family Eupteleaceae has been recognized by many taxonomists. The APG IV system (2016; unchanged from the APG III system of 2009, the APG II system of 2003 and the APG system of 1998), recognizes it and places it in the order Ranunculales, in the clade eudicots. The family consists of a single genus Euptelea, with two species, native to eastern Asia.

Euptelea polyandra is used as a food plant by the larvae of some Lepidoptera species including the engrailed.

The flowers lack sepals and petals. The anthers are basifixed, and the leaves are arranged in whorls.

The fossil range of the genus extends back to the Paleocene epoch, during much of the Cenozoic it was distributed widely over the Northern Hemisphere.

References

External links

 Floral Morphology in Euptelea  
Eupteleaceae in L. Watson and M.J. Dallwitz (1992 onwards). The families of flowering plants.
Flora of China: Eupteleaceae
NCBI Taxonomy Browser
  links at CSDL, Texas

Ranunculales
Ranunculales genera